Nathan Wood (born 24 January 1972 in Darlinghurst, New South Wales) is an Australian former professional rugby league footballer.

Playing career
Wood was a Souths junior but made his first-grade début for Balmain in round 17 of the 1993 season. Between 1993 and 2001 he played for the Balmain Tigers, Sydney Roosters and the New Zealand Warriors in the NSWRL premiership, Australian Rugby League and National Rugby League. He then moved to the Super League and played for the Wakefield Trinity Wildcats and the Warrington Wolves. He retired at the end of 2005 due to injury, moving back to Australia to care for his two sons.

During his Warrington career Nat was in the victorious team that played the final game at Wilderspool Stadium in 2003 and was the first try scorer at the new Halliwell Jones Stadium in 2004, both games were against his old club Wakefield.

Wood appeared as a challenger on the 2008 series of Gladiators.

Wood is the son of former Newtown, Norths and Souths , Barry Wood, and brother of The Contender Australia winner and former Souths player Garth Wood.

References

Sources

1972 births
Living people
Australian rugby league players
Australian expatriate sportspeople in England
Balmain Tigers players
New Zealand Warriors players
Sydney Roosters players
Wakefield Trinity players
Warrington Wolves players
Rugby league halfbacks
Rugby league hookers
Rugby league players from Sydney